Taskmaster Australia is an Australian comedy panel game show first broadcast on Network 10 on 2 February 2023. Based on the UK series Taskmaster created by comedian Alex Horne, it sets five comedians ridiculous tasks to complete, and judged against each other by "The Taskmaster", Tom Gleeson, accompanied by his assistant, comedian Tom Cashman.

Format
Taskmaster is a comedic panel show wherein five contestants compete in the completion of tasks set by "The Taskmaster" (Tom Gleeson) and umpired by the "Taskmaster's Assistant" (Tom Cashman). The tasks can involve physical, creative and lateral thinking skills.

Following the format of the British version, in each episode contestants compete for five prizes that they have brought in, along a theme that they are ranked against for points. Three pre-recorded tasks—completed separately by each contestant (or occasionally in teams)—are shown and judged in the studio by The Taskmaster. Tasks are filmed within the Taskmaster Retreat, with the areas including The Lounge, The Kitchen, The Lab and The Caravan. A final live task takes place in the studio. As well as winners within each episode, one contestant becomes the winner of the series and takes place a trophy modeled after The Taskmaster's head.

Production
The Taskmaster franchise was conceived of by Alex Horne and first televised in Britain, where Horne plays the Taskmaster's Assistant. The British version debuted in 2014. Confirmation of an Australian version was announced in October 2022, to be produced by Avalon Television (the British production company) with Kevin & Co for Network 10.

The pre-recorded tasks were filmed in the same house in New Zealand that the Taskmaster New Zealand uses. It is known as "The Taskmaster Retreat" in the Australian version and "The Taskmaster Ranch" in the New Zealand version. Filming took up to ten hours per day.

Filming for the studio shows took place in December 2022 at the NEP Studios in Eveleigh, Sydney, New South Wales. Gleeson remarked of the filming, that it was the first show he had done where "right from the very first episode, all the audience seats were sold out".

Tasks for the series were written by a team, which includes Sam Smith (who also writes tasks for the New Zealand version), alongside Cashman, with development assisted by show producer Cam Bakker, and, as with all the international adaptations, sent to show creator Alex Horne for final approval. Executive producer Sarah Thornton remarked that the aim is to bring in new writers each series to "keep it fresh".

Episodes

The first series consists of 10 episodes. The contestants are Danielle Walker, Jimmy Rees, Julia Morris, Luke McGregor and Nina Oyama.

Reception

Ratings
Chortle reported that the pilot was a "strong start" for ratings, as the show was third in its timeslot.

Critical reception
The Age praised that the third episode saw the series "continue to settle in nicely", largely in the style of the British version. The reviewer noted that Gleeson—"a cheerful, friendly-looking chap who has built a career on telling people they suck"—has a different Taskmaster personality to British host Greg Davies.

References

External links

Taskmaster Australia at TaskMaster.Info
Interview with Tom Cashman and Nina Oyama in The Sydney Morning Herald

2023 Australian television series debuts
Australian panel games
2020s Australian comedy television series
2020s Australian game shows
Taskmaster (TV series)
Australian television series based on British television series
English-language television shows
Network 10 original programming